is a railway station in the city of Utsunomiya, Tochigi, Japan, operated by the private railway operator Tobu Railway. The station is numbered "TN-40".

Lines

Station layout
The station consists of a bay platform located on the second floor ("2F") level, serving two terminating tracks.

Platforms

Adjacent stations

History
Tobu-Utsunomiya opened on 11 August 1931.

From 17 March 2012, station numbering was introduced on Tobu lines, with Tobu-Utsunomiya Station becoming "TN-40".

Passenger statistics
In fiscal 2019, the station was used by an average of 9604 passengers daily (boarding passengers only).

Surrounding area
The station is located in the same building as the Tobu Department Store in the commercial centre of the city of Utsunomiya. JR East's Utsunomiya Station is located 1.6 km east of the station and connected with this station by frequent bus services. 
 Tochigi Prefectural Capital building
 Utsunomiya City Hall
 Utsunomiya Central Post Office
 Site of former Utsunomiya Castle

References

External links

  

Railway stations in Tochigi Prefecture
Stations of Tobu Railway
Railway stations in Japan opened in 1931
Tobu Utsunomiya Line
Utsunomiya